Michael Burke (born February 25, 1977) is a retired American soccer player.

Career

College and Amateur
Burke attended Loyola University Maryland, playing two seasons of college soccer. In 1997, he left college early for personal reasons. His professional soccer career started in his hometown of Jacksonville, FL.  He spent time  with Deportivo Cali in Colombia and Nottingham Forest in England.

Professional
Burke began his professional career in 1998 when he signed with the Jacksonville Cyclones of the A-League. Late in the season, Michael Burke asked to be released to pursue other teams. After Burke sat out for a week of training, the club agreed to trade him to the Charleston Battery and Burke was named the 1998 USL A-League Rookie of the Year.

Burke was drafted in the fourth round (41st overall) in the 2000 MLS SuperDraft by D.C. United. He played seven games for United before being released on June 2, 2000. He then signed with the Dallas Burn on June 15, and played two games in Dallas before being released on June 30.

Burke signed with the Richmond Kickers the next day and has remained with that team since then, playing over 200 games and scoring over 25 goals during his tenure. Burke earned Supporter’s Choice MVP honors in 2005, 2006, 2007, 2008, and 2009.  He garnered the MVP award of the USL2 Championship game in 2006, was the USL2 Most Valuable Player and was named Kickers' captain in 2007, was a USL-2 MVP Finalist in 2006, 2007, and 2008 and All-League First Team midfielder in 2006-09, and led the Kickers to his second USL2 championship in 2009. He also had a loan stint with D.C. United when he was called up as a backup for injured players early in 2002 for the 2002 CONCACAF Champions' Cup. He then played the game against Comunicaciones F.C. on March 6.

Burke came out of retirement in 2012 to make a final push for the playoffs.  He recorded 2 assists during this short stint.

Honors
1998 USL 1 Rookie of the Year
1999 Charleston Battery Supporters Choice MVP
2005-2009 USL 1 Richmond Kickers Supporters Choice MVP
2006 USL 2 Champion, USL 2 MVP Finalist, USL All League First Team, Richmond Kickers Supporters Choice MVP, Richmond Kickers Players Choice MVP, USL 2 Championship Game MVP
2007 USL 2 MVP Finalist, USL 2 All League First Team, Richmond Kickers Supporters Choice MVP, USL 2 Assist Leader
2008 USL 2 MVP, USL 2 All League First team, USL 2 Richmond Kickers Supporters Choice MVP, USL 2 Richmond Kickers Players Choice MVP, USL 2 Assist Leader
 2009 USL 2 Champion, USL 2 All League First Team, Richmond Kickers Supporters Choice MVP

References

External links
Richmond Kickers bio

1977 births
Living people
American soccer players
Charleston Battery players
D.C. United players
FC Dallas players
Jacksonville Cyclones players
Loyola Greyhounds men's soccer players
Richmond Kickers players
A-League (1995–2004) players
Major League Soccer players
USL First Division players
USL Second Division players
USL Championship players
D.C. United draft picks
Soccer players from Jacksonville, Florida
Association football midfielders